The HWA Cruiserweight Championship was a title contested in the Heartland Wrestling Association.  It was introduced on August 22, 1997 when Tarek The Great became the first champion. On January 6, 2004 it was retired and renamed to the HWA Television Championship. The title was re-activated on August 30, 2008 and Aaron Williams became the first champion since the re-activation.  But on June 10, 2009 it was retired a second time and was again renamed, this time to the HWA American Luchadore Championship.  Williams remained the champion as a result.

Title history

List of combined reigns

See also
Heartland Wrestling Association
HWA American Luchacore Championship

References

External links

Heartland Wrestling Association championships
Cruiserweight wrestling championships